The cabinet of Ștefan Golescu was the government of Romania from 17 August 1867 to 29 April 1868.

Ministers
The ministers of the cabinet were as follows:

President of the Council of Ministers:
Ștefan Golescu (17 August 1867 - 29 April 1868)
Minister of the Interior: 
Ștefan Golescu (17 August 1867 - 13 November 1867)
Ion C. Brătianu (13 November 1867 - 29 April 1868)
Minister of Foreign Affairs: 
Alexandru Teriachiu (17 August 1867 - 1 November 1867)
(interim) Ștefan Golescu (1 - 13 November 1867)
Ștefan Golescu (13 November 1867 - 29 April 1868)
Minister of Finance:
Ludovic Steege (17 August 1867 - 1 October 1867)
(interim) Grigore Arghiropol (1 - 27 October 1867)
Ion C. Brătianu (27 October - 13 November 1867)
(interim) Ion C. Brătianu (13 November 1867 - 29 April 1868)
Minister of Justice:
Anton I. Arion (17 - 29 August 1867)
Grigore Arghiropol (29 August - 13 November 1867)
Anton I. Arion (13 November 1867 - 29 April 1868)
Minister of War:
Col. Gheorghe Adrian (17 August 1867 - 29 April 1868)
Minister of Religious Affairs:
Dimitrie Gusti (17 August 1867 - 29 April 1868)
Minister of Public Works:
Dimitrie C. Brătianu (17 August 1867 - 13 November 1867)
Panait Donici (13 November 1867 - 29 April 1868)

References

Cabinets of Romania
Cabinets established in 1867
Cabinets disestablished in 1868
1867 establishments in Romania
1868 disestablishments in Romania